Tiddas is a commune in Khémisset Province of the Rabat-Salé-Kénitra administrative region of Morocco. At the time of the 2004 census, the commune had a total population of 11,831 people living in 2575 households. Tiddas is noted for its moussem every September, and colourful horsemen.

References

Populated places in Khémisset Province
Rural communes of Rabat-Salé-Kénitra